Adam Driver is an American actor. Among his several accolades, he has received nominations for two Academy Awards, two Golden Globe Awards and two British Academy Film Awards, as well as nominations for one Tony Award, four Screen Actors Guild Awards, and four Primetime Emmy Awards. His breakthrough came in 2012 when he was cast in HBO comedy-drama series Girls (2012–2017), receiving three consecutive nominations for the Primetime Emmy Award for Outstanding Supporting Actor in a Comedy Series and a nomination for a Critics' Choice Television Award. The supporting role in Tracks earned him a Best Actor in a Supporting Role nomination in Film Critics Circle of Australia. The same year he was awarded by Venice Film Festival a Volpi Cup for Best Actor for his role in Hungry Hearts. For his role as Kylo Ren in the Star Wars sequel trilogy, Driver received a Saturn Award for Best Supporting Actor, one Teen Choice Awards and a MTV Movie Award, while for Jim Jarmusch's drama Paterson he received multiple nominations for Best Actor from critics associations, winning several.

In 2018, Driver received several nominations for his performance in the film BlacKkKlansman including nominations for Academy Award for Best Supporting Actor, BAFTA Award, Golden Globe Award, Screen Actors Guild Awards, and Critics' Choice Movie Award for Best Supporting Actor. He once again earned significant acclaim and nominations for Academy Award for Best Actor, BAFTA Award, Golden Globe Award, Screen Actors Guild Awards, and Independent Spirit Awards, among other accolades, for his performance as a theater director going through a divorce in Marriage Story (2019). 

In 2022, he became only the second American actor, to be nominated for a Cesar award in France, for his role in Leos Carax's musical Annette.

Major associations

Academy Awards

British Academy Film Awards

Primetime Emmy Awards

Golden Globe Awards

Screen Actors Guild Awards

Tony Awards

Critics' Awards

Film Festival Awards

Los Cabos International Film Festival

Palm Springs International Film Festival

Santa Barbara International Film Festival

Venice Film Festival

Industry Awards

AACTA Awards

César Awards

Gotham Independent Film Awards

Independent Spirit Awards

Lucille Lortel Awards

MTV Movie & TV Awards

Sant Jordi Awards

Satellite Awards

Saturn Awards

Taron Awards

Teen Choice Awards

Village Voice Film Poll

Young Hollywood Awards

References

External links
 

Lists of awards received by American actor